The Lamentation over the Dead Christ is an incomplete bronze relief sculpture of , produced in his old age by Donatello and now in the Victoria and Albert Museum in London. It measures 32.1 by 41.7 cm.

It is generally held to be a fragment or test piece for the bronze doors commissioned from the artist for Siena Cathedral but never completed. It may be the bronze of the subject recorded as being in the cathedral's possession in 1659.

See also
 List of statues of Jesus

References

Bronze sculptures
Sculptures by Donatello
Sculptures of the Victoria and Albert Museum
Religious sculptures
1450s sculptures
Donatello